Opalin is a protein that is encoded in humans by the OPALIN gene.

References

Further reading